Concretely is a liberal political party in Slovenia led by former Minister of Economical Development and Techonolgy Zdravko Počivalšek. Founding congress took place on 4 December 2021 in Celje. Concretly is a result of a merger between the Modern Centre Party (SMC) and Economic Activity Party. It is a member of Let's Connect Slovenia alliance.

History
At Počivalšek's takeover on the lead of the political party in 2019 he announced consolidation of SMC party. On SMC congress on 16 September Počivalšek announced a fusion with GAS, which was led by the president of the National Council of Slovenia, Alojz Kovšca. Delegates of both parties supported the merger, they also announced a merger with a few smaller local parties. GAS made a decision about consolidation in November 2021. 

On 4 December 2021, SMC merged with the extra-parliamentary Economic Activity Party. With this, SMC's membership in Alliance of Liberals and Democrats for Europe Party (ALDE) was automatically terminated. After the process, newly formed Concretely kept its 5 members of the Parliament. Later in December 2021, MP Mateja Udovč left the party, leaving Concretely with 4 members of the parliament (the number which it kept until the 8th term of Slovene National Assembly concluded in 2022).

Results

National Assembly

References 

2021 establishments in Slovenia
Alliance of Liberals and Democrats for Europe Party member parties
Centrist parties in Slovenia
Liberal International
Liberal parties in Slovenia
Political parties established in 2021
Social liberal parties
Pro-European political parties in Slovenia